Chidi Emma Osuchukwu (born 11 October 1993) is a Nigerian professional footballer who plays as a midfielder.

Club career
Between 2013 and 2017 he played for Braga B.

On 3 September 2020, Osuchukwu's club Rukh Brest announced his transfer to the Russian Premier League club FC Khimki. Khimki never confirmed the transfer and he was not registered with the RPL as a player of Khimki. On 16 October 2020 he signed with a different Russian club, Tom Tomsk.

On 27 February 2021, Ordabasy announced the signing of Osuchukwu.

On 6 February 2022, Turan announced the signing of Osuchukwu.

References

External links
Profile at westafricanfootball.com

1993 births
Sportspeople from Benin City
Living people
Nigerian footballers
Nigeria under-20 international footballers
Association football midfielders
Nigerian expatriate footballers
Expatriate footballers in Portugal
Expatriate footballers in Belarus
Expatriate footballers in Russia
Expatriate footballers in Kazakhstan
Dolphin F.C. (Nigeria) players
Gateway United F.C. players
S.C. Braga players
S.C. Braga B players
FC Dynamo Brest players
FC Rukh Brest players
FC Tom Tomsk players
FC Ordabasy players
FC Turan players
FC Tobol players
Primeira Liga players
Liga Portugal 2 players
Belarusian Premier League players
Russian First League players
Kazakhstan Premier League players